Gringalet is a 1946 French comedy film directed by André Berthomieu and starring Charles Vanel, Marguerite Deval and Suzy Carrier. It was based on the play of the same title by Paul Vandenberghe, who co-wrote the screenplay and also appears in the title role. The film was later remade as the 1959 Argentine film Gringalet

The film's sets were designed by the art director Paul-Louis Boutié.

Synopsis
A widowed industrialist discovers that he has a secret second son, a painter Francis known as "Gringalet". He insists on inviting him to come and live with the family, to the resentment of the elder son Philippe and his grandmother. However the young man has such charm that he wins them all over.

Cast
Charles Vanel as Lucien Ravaut
 Marguerite Deval as Madame Bachelet
 Suzy Carrier as Josette Blanchard
 Jimmy Gaillard as Philippe Ravaut
 Paul Vandenberghe as Francis Ravaut dit Gringalet
 Paul Faivre as Emile Moret
 Alain Romans as Le pianiste 
 Marcelle Hainia as Madame Blanchard
 Christiane Sertilange as 	Minouche
 Jacques Louvigny as Monsiieur Blanchard
 André Bervil
 Fernand Rauzéna	
 Henry Prestat

References

Bibliography
 Goble, Alan. The Complete Index to Literary Sources in Film. Walter de Gruyter, 1999.

External links
 

1946 films
1946 comedy films
1940s French-language films
French comedy films
Films directed by André Berthomieu
Pathé films
French films based on plays
1940s French films